This was the first edition of the tournament.

Grégoire Barrère and Albano Olivetti won the title after defeating Sadio Doumbia and Fabien Reboul 6–2, 6–4 in the final.

Seeds

Draw

References

External links
 Main draw

Internazionali di Tennis Città di Parma - Doubles